Following is a list of all Article III United States federal judges appointed by President James Buchanan during his presidency. In total Buchanan appointed 8 Article III federal judges, including 1 Associate Justice to the Supreme Court of the United States, and 7 judges to the United States district courts. Buchanan appointed no judges to the United States circuit courts during his time in office.

Buchanan appointed 2 judges to the United States Court of Claims, an Article I tribunal.

United States Supreme Court justices

District courts

Specialty courts (Article I)

United States Court of Claims

Notes

References
General

 

Specific

Sources
 Federal Judicial Center

Buchanan